Franck Touron (born 1 December 1970) is a French football manager and former professional player who played as a defender. He spent most of his playing career at Nîmes. As of the 2021–22 season, he is an assistant manager at Départemental 2 club Paulhan-Pézenas.

Honours 
Nîmes

 Championnat National 1: 1996–97
 Coupe de France runner-up: 1995–96

References 

1970 births
Living people
Sportspeople from Valence, Drôme
Footballers from Auvergne-Rhône-Alpes
French footballers
Association football defenders
Nîmes Olympique players
Grenoble Foot 38 players
Ligue 2 players
Ligue 1 players
Championnat National 2 players
Championnat National players
French football managers
Association football coaches
ES Paulhan-Pézenas non-playing staff